Carmen Rinke (born December 7, 1953 in Blairmore, Alberta) is a retired boxer from Canada, who represented his native country at the 1976 Summer Olympics. There he was defeated in the quarterfinals of the men's welterweight division (– 67 kilograms) by East Germany's eventual gold medalist Jochen Bachfeld. In the previous round, Rinke defeated Yoshifumi Seki of Japan.

1976 Olympic record
Below is the record of Carmen Rinke, a Canadian welterweight boxer who competed at the 1976 Montreal Olympics:

 Round of 64: bye
 Round of 32: defeated Kenny Bristol (Guyana) by walkover
 Round of 16: defeated Yoshifumi Seki (Japan) by decision, 4-1
 Quarterfinal: lost to Jochen Bachfeld (East Germany) by decision, 0-5

References
 Canadian Olympic Committee

1953 births
Living people
Sportspeople from Alberta
Boxers at the 1976 Summer Olympics
Olympic boxers of Canada
Boxers at the 1974 British Commonwealth Games
Commonwealth Games competitors for Canada
Boxers at the 1975 Pan American Games
Pan American Games competitors for Canada
Welterweight boxers
Canadian male boxers
20th-century Canadian people